Peabody & Stearns was a premier architectural firm in the Eastern United States in the late 19th century and early 20th century. Based in Boston, Massachusetts, the firm consisted of Robert Swain Peabody (1845–1917) and John Goddard Stearns Jr. (1843–1917). The firm worked on in a variety of designs but is closely associated with shingle style.

With addition of Pierce P. Furber, presumably as partner, the firm became Peabody, Stearns & Furber. The firm was later succeeded by W. Cornell Appleton, one of the Peabody & Stearns architects, and Frank Stearns, son of Frank, as Appleton & Stearns.

Works

Georgia
 Plum Orchard (George L. Carnegie House), Cumberland Island (1898)
 Stafford Place (William Carnegie House), Cumberland Island (1901)
 Greyfeild (Margaret Carnegie Ricketson House), Cumberland Island (1901)

Maine
 York Hall (William D. Sewall House), 1 Edwards St., Bath (1896–98)
 Bangor High School, 185 Harlow St., Bangor (1912)
 Bangor Public Library, 145 Harlow St., Bangor (1912)
 Exchange Building, 27 State St., Bangor (1912–13)

Massachusetts

 Matthews Hall, Harvard University, Cambridge, (1871)
 Bussey Institute, Harvard University, Cambridge, (1871)
 Frederick L. Ames House, 306 Dartmouth St., Boston (1872)
 College Hall, Smith College, Northampton (1875)
 R. H. White department store, 518–536 Washington Street, Boston (1876)
 Shepherd Brooks House, 275 Grove St., Medford (1881)
 21 Ashcroft Road, Medford, Massachusetts (1878)
 Henry Bradlee Jr. House, Medford (1881–82)
 James C. Bayley House, 16 Fairmont Ave., Newton (1883–84)
 Kragsyde (George N. Black Jr. House), 27 Smith's Point Rd., Manchester-by-the-Sea (1883) - Demolished 1929.
 Elm Court (William D. Sloane House), 310 Old Stockbridge Rd., Lenox (1886)
 Exchange Building, 53 State St., Boston (1887–91)
 Charles E. Cotting Buildings, 186-192 South St., Boston (1891)
 Wheatleigh (Henry H. Cook House), Hawthorne Rd., Stockbridge (1893)
 Fiske Building, 75 State St., Boston (1896) - Demolished 1984.
 Christ Episcopal Church, 750 Main St., Waltham (1897-1902)
 Worcester City Hall, 455 Main St., Worcester (1898)
 Dorchester Heights Monument, Dorchester (1902)
 Marlborough Public Library, 35 W. Main St., Marlborough (1903–04)
 Springfield Fire & Marine Insurance Co. Building, 195 State St., Springfield (1905)
 U. S. Custom House Tower, Boston (1913–15)
 Norfolk County Registry of Deeds, Dedham, Massachusetts (1905)

Missouri
 St. Louis School and Museum of Fine Arts, 1815 Locust St., St. Louis (1879–81) - Demolished 1919.
 Unitarian Church of the Messiah, 508 N. Garrison Ave., St. Louis (1880–82) - Demolished 1987.
 Turner Building, 304 N. 8th St., St. Louis (1882–83) - Demolished 1902.
 St. Louis Club, T.E. Huntley Ave. & Locust Blvd., St. Louis (1884–85) - Demolished.
 George Blackman House, 5843 Bartmer Ave., St. Louis (1885)
 Alvah Mansur House, 3700 Lindell Blvd., St. Louis (1885–86)
 Charles F. Morse House, 200 E. 36th St., Kansas City (1887) - Demolished.
 Henry L. Newman House, 21 Westmoreland Pl., St. Louis (1889) - Demolished.
 Security Building, 319 N. 4th St., St. Louis (1890–92), (Peabody, Stearns & Furber)
 Corinne Dyer House, 38 Westmoreland Pl., St. Louis (1892)
 Edward C. Rowse House, 10 Benton Pl., St. Louis (1892)
 John T. Davis House, 17 Westmoreland Pl., St. Louis (1893–94)
Dr. George Ashe Bronson House, 3201 Washington Ave., St. Louis (1885)

Minnesota
 James J. Hill House, 240 Summit Ave., St. Paul (1887–91) - Peabody & Stearns were fired from the project in 1889.
 Union Depot, 509 W. Michigan Ave., Duluth (1890–92)

New Jersey
 Elberon Casino, Lincoln Ave., Elberon (1882–83) - Demolished.
 Lawrenceville School, Lawrenceville (1884–95)
 Central Railroad of New Jersey Terminal, Jersey City (1888–89)

Pennsylvania
 George W. Childs-Drexel House, 1726 Locust St., Philadelphia (1893)
 Nathaniel Holmes House, Morewood & 5th Aves., Pittsburgh (1895) - Demolished.
 Harvey Childs House, 718 Devonshire St., Pittsburgh (1896)
 Sarah Drexel Fell House, 1801 Walnut St., Philadelphia (1896–98)
 Durbin Horne House, 7418 Penn Ave., Pittsburgh (1897)
 Joseph Horne & Co. Dept. Store, 501 Penn Ave., Pittsburgh (1897–98)
 East Liberty Market, 5900 Baum Blvd., Pittsburgh (1898-1900)
 Remsen V. Messler House, 651 Morewood Ave., Pittsburgh (1900–01)
 Laurento (E. Craig Biddle House), Darby-Paoli Rd., Villanova (1901) - Demolished 1980s.
 Penshurst (Percival Roberts House), Conshohocken State Rd., Lower Merion (1901) - Demolished.
 Krisheim (George Woodward House), 7514 McCallum St., Philadelphia (1910)
 Westview (Livingston L. Biddle House), Westview Rd., Bryn Mawr (1917)

Rhode Island

 Frederick S. G. D'Hauteville House, 489 Bellevue Ave., Newport (1871) - Burned.
 Nathan Matthews House, 492 Bellevue Ave., Newport (1871–72) - Burned 1881.
 Weetamoe (Nathaniel Thayer House), 2 Rovensky Ave., Newport (1872)
 Grace W. Rives House, 30 Red Cross Ave., Newport (1875–76)
 The Breakers (Pierre Lorillard IV House), 44 Ochre Point Ave., Newport (1877–78) - Burned 1892, later replaced.
 Hillside (Arthur B. Emmons House), 300 Gibbs Ave., Newport (1882)
 Vinland (Catharine Lorillard Wolfe House), Newport (1882–83) - Now Salve Regina's Mcauley Hall.
 Honeysuckle Lodge (Josiah M. Fiske House), 255 Ruggles Ave., Newport (1885–86)
 Midcliff (Caroline Ogden M. Jones House), 229 Ruggles Ave., Newport (1886)
 Pavilion, Easton's Beach, Memorial Blvd., Newport (1887) - Destroyed 1938
 Ocean Lawn (Elizabeth Gammell House), 51 Cliff Ave., Newport (1888–89)
 Rough Point (Frederick W. Vanderbilt House), 680 Bellevue Ave., Newport (1888–91)

 Althorpe (John T. Spencer House), Ruggles Ave., Newport (1889–90) - Now Salve Regina's Founders Hall.
 Episcopal Church of the Messiah, 1680 Westminster St., Providence (1889–90)
 Rockhurst (H. Mortimer Brooks House), Bellevue Ave., Newport (1891) - Demolished 1955.
 Parish House for St. John's Episcopal Church, 275 N. Main St., Providence (1893) - Demolished.
 Shamrock Cliff (G. M. Gaun McRobert Hutton House), 65 Ridge Rd., Newport (1894)
 Beechbound (William F. Burden House), 127 Harrison Ave., Newport (1895)
 Bleak House (Ross R. Winans House), Ocean Ave., Newport (1895) - Demolished 1948.
 Ridgemere (Fannie Foster House), 11 Leroy Ave., Newport (1896)
 Hopedene (Elizabeth H. Gammell Slater House), 43 Cliff Ave., Newport (1899-1902)
 Providence Journal Building, 60 Eddy St., Providence (1906)

Washington, D.C.
 Volta Bureau, 3414 Volta Pl. NW, Washington, D.C. (1893)

Notable architects who worked for Peabody & Stearns 

 John Scudder Adkins—worked at the firm where he likely helped design buildings for the World's Columbian Exposition in 1893.
 Francis Richmond Allen—began career at the firm. Left to co-find Allen & Collens which designed numerous churches and university buildings including Riverside Church and William Oxley Thompson Memorial Library.
 Charles L. Bevins—worked for the firm for a time between 1878 and 1882. Later started his own practice in Jamestown, Rhode Island specializing in shingle style cottages for summer residents.
 Clarence H. Blackall—worked for the firm from 1884–1888 and was chief draftsman. Left to start Blackall, Clapp and Whittemore. Helped established the Boston Architectural College and estimated to have designed 300 theatres including the Colonial Theatre and Metropolitan Theatre in Boston.
 Warren R. Briggs—worked for the firm from 1874–1876. Established an independent practice in 1877 in Bridgeport, Connecticut.
 Henry Budden—Australian architect who worked at the firm during the mid-1890s. Started the Sydney based firm Kent & Budden in 1899.
 Henry Ives Cobb—worked at the firm from 1881–1882. Moved to Chicago in 1882 and co-found Cobb and Frost.
 Charles Collens—apprentice for the firm before leaving to co-found Allen & Collens which designed numerous churches and university buildings including Central Presbyterian Church and Thompson Memorial Library.
 Charles Sumner Frost—worked at the firm from 1876–1881. Moved to Chicago in 1882 and co-found Cobb and Frost.
 George A. Fuller—worked at the firm from 1876–1880 and became partner in charge of the New York City office. Notably designed the Union League Club of New York and United Bank Building. Left Peabody & Stearns to start the George A. Fuller Company in Chicago. He is often credited as being the "inventor" of modern skyscrapers and the modern contracting system.
 Edward T. P. Graham—worked at the firm in 1904. Later started his own firm designing Roman Catholic churches in Boston and the Midwest.
 Charles R. Greco—worked at the firm from 1900–1907. Left to start his own firm designing religious buildings in Massachusetts.
 S. Wesley Haynes—started his own firm in 1918. Designed numerous schools throughout New England.
 Burnham Hoyt—began at the firm and left to start a firm with his brother. Designed commercial, residential, academic, and religious buildings in the Denver area. Later became professor at New York University and eventually Dean of the School of Architecture.
 Westray Ladd—after working for Peabody & Stearns, Ladd ran his own firm from 1883–1902 in Philadelphia, mainly residential architecture.
 Ellis F. Lawrence—apprenticed at the firm in 1902. Later co-founder and first dean of the University of Oregon's School of Architecture and Allied Arts.
 Ion Lewis—worked at the firm after graduating from MIT until 1882. Co-found the Oregon firm Whidden & Lewis.
 Louis Christian Mullgardt—worked at the firm around 1886. Started his own San Francisco firm designing buildings such as the Arlington Hotel.
 Orlando Whitney Norcross—Norcross Brothers partner. After H.H. Richardson's death, he worked for Peabody & Stearns.
 Henry C. Pelton—began at the firm before starting own practice. Designed Riverside Church and Central Presbyterian Church with Allen & Collens.
 Frederick Lincoln Savage—office boy and apprentice at the firm from 1884–1886. Designed numerous Tudor-style and shingle-style houses in Northeast Harbor, Maine such as Reverie Cove and John Innes Kane Cottage.
 Albert Cicero Schweinfurth—apprentice and draftsman at the firm from 1882–1883. His brothers Henry and Julius also worked at the firm. Later started his own California firm and designed buildings such as the First Unitarian Church in Berkeley and Hacienda del Pozo de Verona.
 Timothy F. Walsh—worked at the firm from 1887–1897. Left to co-found Maginnis & Walsh which designed numerous religious and academic buildings mostly in New England including St. Patrick's Cathedral, St. Andrew Church, and the Boston Consumptives Hospital.
 Joseph Morrill Wells—worked at the firm from 1874–1875. Later credited with designing the Villard Houses.
 Edmund M. Wheelwright—worked at the firm in the late 1870s. Served as city architect for Boston from 1891–1895.
 Arthur H. Vinal—apprenticed at the firm before starting his own practice in 1875. Served as the first City Architect of Boston from 1884–1887.

Images

Notes

References

Further reading
 Wheaton A. Holden. "The Peabody Touch: Peabody and Stearns of Boston, 1870-1917." Journal of the Society of Architectural Historians, Vol. 32, No. 2 (May, 1973)

External links

 The Architecture of Peabody & Stearns
 The Brooks Estate
East Liberty Market House (Motor Square Garden) and Harvey Childs house
 Laurelawn, Hopedene
 Worcester City Hall
 Fiske Building
 Matthews Hall

Peabody and Stearns buildings
Architecture firms based in Massachusetts
Gilded Age